Alexandros Garpozis (born September 5, 1980) is retired Cypriot football midfielder. During his career he played for Anorthosis, Skoda Xanthi, PAOK FC, AEL Limassol, Apollon Limassol, AEZ Zakakiou, AEP Paphos and AEK Kouklia.

External links
 
 

1980 births
Living people
Sportspeople from Limassol
Cypriot footballers
Cyprus international footballers
Association football midfielders
Cypriot expatriate footballers
AEL Limassol players
PAOK FC players
Xanthi F.C. players
Apollon Limassol FC players
Anorthosis Famagusta F.C. players
AEP Paphos FC players
AEK Kouklia F.C. players
Pafos FC players
AEZ Zakakiou players
Expatriate footballers in Greece
Cypriot expatriate sportspeople in Greece
Super League Greece players
Cypriot First Division players
Cypriot Second Division players
Cypriot football managers